Tauherenikau is a rural locality and a statistical area in the South Wairarapa District and Wellington Region of New Zealand's North Island. The statistical area surrounds but does not include Greytown.

The name, originally Tauwharenikau, means "the house made of nikau palm fronds".

Tauherenikau Racecourse opened in 1874.

Tauherenikau School operated from 1878 to 1936. It closed as the roll had dwindled to five students. The peak roll was 46 in 1917.

Fernside Homestead is a large wooden house built in 1924 on the west side of the river near Tauherenikau.

Demographics 

Tauherenikau had a population of 1,353 at the 2018 New Zealand census, an increase of 132 people (10.8%) since the 2013 census, and an increase of 381 people (39.2%) since the 2006 census. There were 522 households. There were 678 males and 675 females, giving a sex ratio of 1.0 males per female. The median age was 47.5 years (compared with 37.4 years nationally), with 249 people (18.4%) aged under 15 years, 165 (12.2%) aged 15 to 29, 705 (52.1%) aged 30 to 64, and 234 (17.3%) aged 65 or older.

Ethnicities were 92.5% European/Pākehā, 8.0% Māori, 1.3% Pacific peoples, 2.2% Asian, and 2.7% other ethnicities (totals add to more than 100% since people could identify with multiple ethnicities).

The proportion of people born overseas was 20.2%, compared with 27.1% nationally.

Although some people objected to giving their religion, 50.8% had no religion, 39.0% were Christian, 0.9% were Buddhist and 2.4% had other religions.

Of those at least 15 years old, 312 (28.3%) people had a bachelor or higher degree, and 165 (14.9%) people had no formal qualifications. The median income was $37,200, compared with $31,800 nationally. The employment status of those at least 15 was that 567 (51.4%) people were employed full-time, 252 (22.8%) were part-time, and 24 (2.2%) were unemployed.

References

South Wairarapa District
Populated places in the Wellington Region